Xou da Xuxa Sete is the eleventh studio album and the eighth in Portuguese by Brazilian singer, TV host and actress Xuxa Meneghel. It was released on October 2, 1992 by Som Livre. It was the last album of the series Xuxa Show.

The disc brings a more mature and cheerful Xuxa with lambada influences. As a highlight we have the songs: "Marquei um X" and "Nosso Canto de Paz". Xou da Xuxa Sete sold approximately 1 million copies.

Production 
In 1991, Xuxa still decided whether or not Xou da Xuxa program would be closed that year. But, I was almost certain that the sixth album of the same title of the program, would be the last of the series. Already it was thought of a collection with the hits of the Xou and a song book, a book with tablature and instrumental scores of some successes of the singer. With the continuation of the program in 1992, was produced the last album of the series.

In an interview, Xuxa even commented that he has received a lot of excited songs for the album and in fact, the album is quite cheerful, despite the air of farewell. The first ones to be recorded were: "Xuxa Park" and "A Vida é Uma Festa", which served as the theme for Xou da Xuxa that season.

The actress Fafy Siqueira who wrote "A Dança do Paloê" for the Xou da Xuxa Seis (1991), the previous year wrote another song especially for the Queen. "Marquei um X" merge its joyful rhythm with the mood of farewell, asking the public to remember Xuxa and his concert with great affection.

As was done since the fifth album of the series, most of the songs recorded for Xou Sete were also recorded in Spanish language. Even those discarded as Earth and Heart and My Mirror.

Initially, the album would be called Xétimo Xou da Xuxa. However, they opted for Xou Xuxa Sete, with the number 7 in full, as well as the previous disk. It would be released between the end of August and the beginning of September, but due to delays in production was released in October.

One of the highlights of the disc is the insert stuffed with images from the personal archive of Xuxa. Several childhood photos were selected, along with the singer's birth certificate and a photo of the rehearsal for the album.

Some of the discarded tracks from the album were made known to the public when they were released on the album Xuxa in 1993. In addition to the previously mentioned, "Brincando com o Tempo" and "Maçã do Amor" were also added to the album.

"Lá vem o Trem", composition by Evandro Mesquita was removed from the album at the last minute. In fact, the title of the song even became known to the press.

Xou da Xuxa Sete was produced by Michael Sullivan and Paulo Massadas, with artistic coordination Marlene Mattos and Xuxa. It was recorded in the studios of Som Livre, and had artistic direction of Max Pierre.

Release and reception
Xou da Xuxa Sete release took place in mid-1992 by Som Livre, the first released the album was on LP. The CD and cassette edition were released in the following weeks. The television program Xou da Xuxa ends at the end of this year and the production was already preparing for a great change in the presenter's career. The year 1992 was decisive in the career of Xuxa, since she had already recorded programs outside Brazil and her international albums had sold well, abroad.

The album was reissued in 1996 in CD and cassette, in 2006 and 2009 in CD, and in 2013 by Som Livre in partnership with Xuxa Produções, the album is part of the box Collection of the Xou da Xuxa. Xou da Xuxa Sete sold more than 1 million copies.

Promotion
The songs of Xou da Xuxa Sete used to be performed in Xou da Xuxa and Paradão da Xuxa. The blonde also sang some tracks, mainly "Nosso Canto de Paz", "A Vida é Uma Festa", "A Pulga" and "Marquei um X", that were the most worked, besides "Xuxa Park" that was used as descent of the ship in the final season of the Xuxa Park. "Marquei um X", "Baila Baila", "A Pulga", "Nosso Canto de Paz", "A Vida é Uma Festa" and "América Geral" won music videos at that year's Christmas special.

Unlike previous albums, Xuxa did not even disclose Xou Sete in another TV show that was not her own. On April 25, 1993, the blonde sang some of her hits in Domingão do Faustão, in addition to "Marquei um X" and "Nosso Canto de Paz", but the participation in the program was with the intention of releasing the program Xuxa, which debuted the following Sunday and not to release the latest album.

There was also a release of the album on the radio. It was sent to radios all over Brazil, the CD-single of the song "Marquei um X", shortly before the album's release. In addition, on October 10, 1992, Xuxa gave an interview to the radio station FM 105 in the program Sala de Visitas (Visiting Room).

Due to the delay in the release of the album and the accumulation of appointments in the Xuxa agenda, only two concerts of the Xuxa 92 tour in Brazil were performed: one in São Paulo and another in Belo Horizonte.

It was broadcast during Rede Globo's programming, two commercials releasing the launch, The first of 30 seconds and the second of 10 seconds.

Track listing

Awards

Personnel
Produced: Michael Sullivan and Paulo Massadas
Cover: Xuxa Meneghel and Reinaldo Waisman
Artistic Coordination: Marlene Mattos and Xuxa Meneghel
Recording Technician: Luiz G. D 'Orey and Luiz Paulo (LP)
Mixing: Jorge 'Gordo' Guimarães
Photos: Isabel Garcia
Arrangement: Jorge 'Jorginho' Corrêa
Studio Assistants and Mixing: Marcelo Serorio, Julio Carneiro, Mauro Moraes, Claudinho, Julinho, Ivan and Billy
Graphic Coordination: Marciso 'Pena' Carvalho
Edition of tape: Jorge 'Gordo' Guimarães
Costume Designer: Sandra Bandeira
Recorded in studios: Free Sound, Live Voice, Yahoo, New Clothes and Cave II
Hair: Fátima Lisboa
Musician: Roberto Fernandes
Art Direction: Max Pierre

Certifications

References

External links 
 Xou da Xuxa Sete at Discogs

1992 albums
Xuxa albums
Som Livre albums
Portuguese-language albums